Animation Magic was a Russian-American animation studio founded in Gaithersburg, Maryland in 1991, with offices later added in Cambridge, Massachusetts and a 100%-owned subsidiary in Saint Petersburg, Russia. The company developed animations for CD-based software. It was acquired in December 1994 by Capitol Multimedia.

By 1994 Animation Magic had 90 employees, including 12 software engineers and approximately 60 animators, computer graphic, background and sprite artists. Its products included Link: The Faces of Evil, Zelda: The Wand of Gamelon, Mutant Rampage: Bodyslam, Pyramid Adventures, I.M. Meen, King's Quest VII: The Princeless Bride, Darby the Dragon, and the cancelled Warcraft Adventures: Lord of the Clans.

Legacy 
Circa 2006, games by Animation Magic were major source materials for YouTube Poops, specifically Link: The Faces of Evil, Zelda: The Wand of Gamelon, and I. M. Meen. 

On September 6, 2020, over 200 animators collaborated to reanimate 21 minutes of cutscenes of The Legend of Zelda CDi games (1989-1996). Over 200 animators collaborated on the project. Nintendo Wire reported, "The ever-shifting mediums and the contrasting animation styles, ranging from professional and sophisticated to intentionally goofy and exaggerated, lend themselves incredibly well to cutscenes that were already chaotic and bizarre to begin with."

References

External links 
 Как создатели мемных спин-оффов «Зельды» изменили российскую индустрию игр и анимации (lit. How the creators of Zelda's meme spin-offs changed the Russian gaming industry and animations) . DTF. November 25, 2021.

Vivendi subsidiaries
Video game companies of Russia
American animation studios
Video game companies established in 1992
Mass media companies established in 1992
Video game companies disestablished in 2001
Mass media companies disestablished in 2001
Defunct video game companies of the United States
Defunct companies based in Maryland
Companies based in Gaithersburg, Maryland